The twelfth season of The Real Housewives of New Jersey, an American reality television series, was broadcast on Bravo from February 1, 2022. It is primarily filmed in New Jersey; its executive producers are Jordana Hochman, Amy Kohn, Lauren Volonakis, Eric Fuller, Taylor Lucy Choi, and Andy Cohen.

The Real Housewives of New Jersey focuses on the lives of returning cast members Teresa Giudice, Melissa Gorga, Dolores Catania, Margaret Josephs, Jennifer Aydin and Jackie Goldschneider. Traci Johnson joins the cast as a Friend of the Housewives.

Production and crew
Jordana Hochman, Amy Kohn, Lauren Volonakis, Eric Fuller, Taylor Lucy Choi, and Andy Cohen are recognized as the series' executive producers; it is produced and distributed by Sirens Media.

Cast
All housewives returned from Season 11.

Episodes

References

External links

2022 American television seasons
New Jersey (season 12)